The Royal Numismatic Society of New Zealand (known as the New Zealand Numismatic Society until 1947) is a nonprofit group founded in 1931 which seeks to "encourage and promote the study of numismatics and other related historical subjects."

It is based in Wellington, New Zealand, where it holds regular meetings open to guests.

History
The New Zealand Numismatic Society was founded in 1931, and the Governor-General of New Zealand has been a patron since then. On 18 October 2020, Dame Patsy Reddy opened the Society's conference in Wellington.

Publications
New Zealand Numismatic Journal, annually
newsletter, two or three times a year

Library

The Royal Numismatic Society maintains a library of numismatic books, which can be accessed by its members by mail.

Fellows
Fellow of the Royal Numismatic Society of New Zealand (FRNSNZ) is a title bestowed upon members as the highest honour that can be conferred by the Royal Numismatic Society of New Zealand. It is awarded for loyal and long service to the Royal Numismatic Society.

Fellows are entitled to use these post-nominal letters as long as they are members of the Society. Non-members who have distinguished themselves in the field of numismatics can be awarded the title "FRNSNZ (Hon.)", which is held for life.

Presidents

The following is a list of the presidents of the Royal Numismatic Society of New Zealand showing years elected:

1931–32: Col. Rev. D. C. Bates
1933–35: Prof. J. Rankine Brown
1936–38: Sir James Elliott
1939–45: Mr Johannes C. Andersen
1946–48: Mr Allan Sutherland
1949: Mr William D. Ferguson
1950–51: Mr Maxwell H. Hornblow
1952–55: Prof. H. A. Murray
1956–60: Capt. G. T. Stagg
1961: Mr James Berry
1962–63: Mr L. J. Dale
1964–67: Mr B. G. Hamlin
1968–69: Mr N. R. A. Netherclift
1969: Capt. G.T. Stagg
1970: Mr J. R. Graydon
1971: Mr A. F. Robb
1972: Mr A. J. Freed
1973–79: Mrs I. Ranger
1980–86: Mr W. H. Lampard
1987–88: Mr R. T. Harwood
1989–2003: Mr W. H. Lampard
2003–06: Mr M. L. Purdy
2006–present: Mr David A. Galt

References

External links

Official website

Organizations established in 1931
Clubs and societies in New Zealand
Organisations based in New Zealand with royal patronage
1931 establishments in New Zealand